Durham Township is a township in Bucks County, Pennsylvania, United States. The population was 1,144 at the 2010 census. It was first organized in 1775 and is located in the extreme north of Bucks County. It was the location of Durham Furnace, Durham Boat Company and Durham Mills.They were known in the early 2000s for their dominating Little League Baseball, and for many consecutive years went undefeated and won championships.

History
The Durham Mill and Furnace was listed on the National Register of Historic Places in 1976.

Geography
It is drained by the Delaware River which forms its eastern boundary with New Jersey.

Its villages include Durham, Durham Furnace, Kintnersville (also in Nockamixon Township,) Lehnenburg, Morgantown, Monroe, and Rattlesnake.

Natural features include Brandywine Creek, Chestnut Hill, Cooks Creek, Durham Cave, Durham Creek, Durham Hill, Molasses Creek, and Rodges Run.

Neighboring municipalities
 Springfield Township (west)
 Nockamixon Township (south)
 Holland Township, New Jersey (east)
 Riegelsville (northeast)
 Williams Township, Northampton County (north)
 Lower Saucon Township, Northampton County (tangent to the northwest)

Demographics

As of the 2010 census, the township was 96.6% White, 0.3% Black or African American, 0.1% Native American, 1.0% Asian, and 0.7% were two or more races. 1.3% of the population were of Hispanic or Latino ancestry.

As of the census of 2000, there were 1,313 people, 485 households, and 382 families residing in the township.  The population density was 142.6 people per square mile (55.0/km2).  There were 525 housing units at an average density of 57.0/sq mi (22.0/km2).  The racial makeup of the township was 98.17% White, 0.08% African American, 0.76% Asian, 0.23% from other races, and 0.76% from two or more races. Hispanic or Latino of any race were 1.07% of the population.

There were 485 households, out of which 34.8% had children under the age of 18 living with them, 70.5% were married couples living together, 4.5% had a female householder with no husband present, and 21.2% were non-families. 17.3% of all households were made up of individuals, and 6.4% had someone living alone who was 65 years of age or older.  The average household size was 2.71 and the average family size was 3.07.

In the township the population was spread out, with 23.9% under the age of 18, 6.8% from 18 to 24, 28.1% from 25 to 44, 29.3% from 45 to 64, and 11.9% who were 65 years of age or older.  The median age was 41 years.  For every 100 females, there were 114.5 males.  For every 100 females age 18 and over, there were 110.8 males.

The median income for a household in the township was $70,875, and the median income for a family was $73,750. Males had a median income of $51,719 versus $34,688 for females. The per capita income for the township was $29,913.  3.9% of the population and 2.7% of families were below the poverty line.  Out of the total population, 3.0% of those under the age of 18 and 3.0% of those 65 and older were living below the poverty line.

Transportation

Main highways serving Durham Townshp include Pennsylvania Route 212 and Pennsylvania Route 611. PA 212 follows a southwest-to-northeast alignment along Durham Road through the heart of the township. Its northern terminus is at PA 611, which follows Easton Road on a north-south alignment across the eastern portion of the township.

Climate
According to the Köppen climate classification system, Durham Twp has a Hot-summer, Humid continental climate (Dfa). Dfa climates are characterized by at least one month having an average mean temperature ≤ , at least four months with an average mean temperature ≥ , at least one month with an average mean temperature ≥  and no significant precipitation difference between seasons. Although most summer days are slightly humid in Durham Twp, episodes of heat and high humidity can occur with heat index values > . The average wettest month is July which corresponds with the annual peak in thunderstorm activity. Episodes of extreme cold and wind can occur with wind chill values < . Ice storms and large snowstorms depositing ≥  of snow occur once every few years, particularly during nor’easters from December through February.

Ecology

According to the A. W. Kuchler U.S. potential natural vegetation types, Durham Twp would have a dominant vegetation type of Appalachian Oak (104) with a dominant vegetation form of Eastern Hardwood Forest (25). The spring bloom typically begins by April 14 and fall color usually peaks by October 26.

References

External links
 Durham Township
  Durham Township

Townships in Bucks County, Pennsylvania
Pennsylvania populated places on the Delaware River